The 4th Armored Division was an armored division of the United States Army that earned distinction while spearheading General Patton's Third Army in the European theater of World War II.

The 4th Armored Division, unlike most other U.S. armored divisions during World War II, did not officially adopt a nickname for the division during the war. However, their unofficial nickname "Name Enough" came into use postwar; the division commander having said, "Fourth Armored Division was name enough"; "They shall be known by their deeds alone." The 4th was named the "Breakthrough" division in 1954, but that name was eventually discontinued.

History
The 4th Armored Division was activated during World War II on 15 April 1941 with 3,800 men (10,000 by the end of May 1941) from various other units, at Pine Camp (Camp Drum, 1951; Fort Drum, 1974), New York under its first Commanding General, Brigadier General Henry W. Baird.

World War II
The division was organized as a full Armored Division in May and June 1942 under the command of Major General John Shirley Wood. It left Pine Camp for Camp Forrest for the Tennessee maneuvers in the Cumberland Mountains held in September and October. In mid-November, it was transferred to the Camp Ibis Desert Training Center (DTC) in the California-Arizona maneuver area and was the first Armored Division to occupy Camp Ibis near Needles, California in the Mojave Desert, which was close to the Arizona and Nevada borders. On 3 June, the 4th AD arrived at Camp Bowie, Texas, an armored training center located in central Texas near Brownwood, for more maneuvers until about December when it departed for Camp Myles Standish in Massachusetts for winter training. On 29 December, the 4th AD departed Boston to conduct training in England in preparation for the invasion of Normandy.

France
After training in England from January to July 1944, the 4th Armored Division landed at Utah Beach, on 11 July, over a month after the initial Normandy landings, and first entered combat on 17 July; on 28 July, battle action as part of the VIII Corps exploitation force for Operation Cobra, the 4th AD secured the Coutances area. The 4th AD then swung south to take Nantes, cutting off the Brittany Peninsula, 12 August 1944. Turning east, it drove swiftly across France north of the Loire, smashed across the Moselle 11–13 September, flanked Nancy and captured Lunéville, 16 September. The 4th AD fought several German panzergrenadier brigades in the Lorraine area including the SS Panzergrenadier Brigade 49 and SS Panzergrenadier Brigade 51 at this time, defeating a larger German force through superior tactics and training.

After maintaining a defensive line, Chambrey to Xanrey to Hénaménil, from 27 September to 11 October, the 4th AD rested briefly before returning to combat 9 November with an attack in the vicinity of Viviers. The 4th AD cleared Bois de Serres, 12 November, advanced through Dieuze and crossed the Saar River, 21–22 November, to establish and expand bridgehead and took Singling and Bining, then Baerendorf 24 November, before being relieved 8 December.

The 4th Armored Division received the following unit awards from France: Croix de Guerre with Palm (27–29 July 1944), Croix de Guerre with Palm (12–29 September 1944), and French Fourragere in the colors of the Croix de Guerre.

Battle of the Bulge

Two days after the Germans launched their Ardennes Offensive, the 4th AD entered the fight (18 December 1944), racing northwest into Belgium, covering 150 miles in 19 hours. The 4th AD, spearheading Patton's Third Army, attacked the Germans at Bastogne and, on 26 December, was the first unit (Company C, 37th Tank Battalion led the 4th Armored Division column that relieved Bastogne during the Battle of the Bulge) to break through at Bastogne and relieve the besieged 101st Airborne Division. Six weeks later the 4th AD jumped off from Luxembourg City in an eastward plunge that carried it across the Moselle River at Trier, south, and east to Worms, and across the Rhine, 24–25 March 1945. Advancing all night, the 4th AD crossed the Main River the next day, south of Hanau, and continued to push on. Lauterbach fell 29 March, Creuzburg across the Werra on 1 April, Gotha on 4 April – where the 4th AD liberated Ohrdruf concentration camp, the first Nazi camp liberated by U.S. troops. By 12 April the 4th AD was across the Saale River. Pursuit of the enemy continued, and by 6 May the division had crossed into Czechoslovakia and established a bridgehead across the Otava River at Strakonice, with forwarding elements at Pisek. The 4th AD was reassigned to the XII Corps on 30 April 1945. The 4th AD received the following Letter of Commendation:

To: Maj. Gen. Hugh J. Gaffey
The outstanding celerity of your movement and the unremitting, vicious and skillful manner in which you pushed the attack, terminating at the end of four days and nights of incessant battle in the relief of Bastogne, constitutes one of the finest chapters in the glorious history of the United States Army. You and the officers and men of your command are hereby commended for a superior performance.

The 4th AD's second commander, Major General John Shirley Wood, (known as "P" Wood to his contemporaries, the "P" standing for "Professor", and "Tiger Jack" to his men) who took over the division officially on 18 June 1942, trained the 4th Armored Division for two years before he personally led it into combat in France, on 28 July 1944, and was awarded the Distinguished Service Cross. On 1 August, Gen. George Patton's U.S. Third Army became operational and the 4th AD became the spearhead of the Third Army. The British military armor theorist and historian, Capt. Basil Henry Liddell Hart, once referred to General Wood as "the Rommel of the American armored forces." Like Rommel, Wood commanded from the front, and preferred staying on the offensive, using speed and envelopment tactics to confuse the enemy. General Wood often utilized a light Piper Cub liaison aircraft flown by his personal pilot, Maj. Charles "Bazooka Charlie" Carpenter, to keep up with his rapidly moving division, sometimes personally carrying corps orders from headquarters directly to his advancing armored columns.

On 3 December 1944, General Wood was relieved as division commander. The division was then led by Major General Hugh Gaffey through the Battle of the Bulge until March 23, when Brigadier General William M. Hoge was awarded command. Major General Fay B. Prickett commanded during the occupation period. Major General Archibald R. Kennedy commanded the division after the war.

Among the most famous members of the 4th AD during World War II was Creighton Abrams, who commanded the 37th Tank Battalion. Abrams later rose to command all U.S. forces in South Vietnam during the Vietnam War and served as Army Chief of Staff in the 1970s. The M-1 tank is named after him. Abrams' friend, Harold Cohen, commanded the 10th Armored Infantry Battalion and fought in concert with Abrams' tanks.

WWII Composition 
The division was composed of the following units:

 Headquarters
 Headquarters Company
 Combat Command A
 Combat Command B
 Combat Command Reserve
 8th Tank Battalion
 35th Tank Battalion
 37th Tank Battalion
 10th Armored Infantry Battalion
 51st Armored Infantry Battalion
 53rd Armored Infantry Battalion
 Headquarters and Headquarters Battery, 4th Armored Division Artillery
 22nd Armored Field Artillery Battalion
 66th Armored Field Artillery Battalion
 94th Armored Field Artillery Battalion
 25th Cavalry Reconnaissance Squadron (Mechanized)
 24th Armored Engineer Battalion
 144th Armored Signal Company
 4th Armored Division Train Headquarters and Headquarters Company
 126th Ordnance Maintenance Battalion
 4th Armored Medical Battalion
 Military Police Platoon
 Band

Post-war
After a tour of occupation duty in Germany, the 4th AD returned to the United States for inactivation. Most of its elements, however, remained as occupation forces in Germany after redesignation as the First Constabulary Brigade. In 1949, it was redesignated the 4th Armored Division and inactivated on 20 May 1949.

The 4th AD was reactivated on 15 June 1954 at Fort Hood in Killeen, Texas with the name 4th Armored "Breakthrough" Division ("Breakthrough" was discontinued some years afterwards) and was deployed to West Germany in 1957 with headquarters at Cooke Barracks in Göppingen. The division appears to have been part of VII Corps for most of this period.

On 30 June 1958, Combat Command "A" was at Wiley Barracks, New Ulm, It comprised 2d Medium Tank Battalion (MTB), 66th Armor (Leipheim); 2d Armored Rifle Battalion (ARB), 41st Infantry (Neu Ulm); and 2d Armored Rifle Battalion, 51st Infantry. Combat Command "B" was at Ferris Barracks, Erlangen, comprising the 1st MTB, 35th Armor (Ferris Barracks); 2d MTB, 67th Armor (Fürth); 2d ARB, 50th Infantry (Ferris Barracks); and 2d Reconnaissance Squadron, 15th Cavalry. Combat Command "C" was at McKee Barracks, Crailsheim. It comprised 1st MTB, 37th Armor (McKee Barracks) and 1st ARB, 54th Infantry.

The 4th AD remained in Germany until final inactivation in May 1971, when it was reflagged as the 1st Armored Division.

In popular culture

In Harold Coyle's 1993 techno-thriller "The Ten Thousand", the 4th Armored Division forms part of the US Army Tenth Corps, and much of the novel's action is depicted from the point of view of members of the division.

List of Commanding Generals during the Cold War
Maj-Gen Andrew P. O'Meara (1 Aug 1957 – 13 Feb 1959)
Maj-Gen James B. Quill (14 Feb 1959 – 1 Apr 1960)
Maj-Gen John K. Waters (2 Apr 1960 – 27 Aug 1961)
Maj-Gen James H. Polk (28 Aug 1961 – 30 Nov 1962)
Maj-Gen John F. Franklin Jr. (1 Dec 1962 – 31 May 1964)
Maj-Gen Alexander D. Surles Jr. (1 Jun 1964 – 17 Dec 1965)
Maj-Gen James W. Sutherland (18 Dec 1965 – 23 May 1967)
Maj-Gen Edward C.D. Scherrer (24 May 1967 – 2 Dec 1968)
Maj-Gen Stephen W. Downey, Jr. (3 Dec 1968 – 4 Feb 1970)
Maj-Gen William W. Cobb (5 Feb 1970 – 10 May 1971)

WWII names
American
 The Rolling 4th
 Flying 4th
 Phantom 4th
 Ghost Division
 Fire Alarm Division
 German
 American Elite Fourth Armored Division
 Roosevelt's Butchers (by Nazi propagandists)

WWII statistics
Casualties
Total battle casualties: 6,212
Killed in action: 1,143
Wounded in action: 4,551
Missing in action: 65
Prisoners of war: 453

 Medal of Honor recipients
James H. Fields
James R. Hendrix
Joseph J. Sadowski

Unit awards
The 4th Armored Division was the first U.S. Armored Division to be awarded the Presidential Unit Citation:
Presidential Unit Citation (Army), World War II (ARDENNES, 22 December 1944 – 27 March 1945; WD GO 54, 1945)
French Croix de Guerre with Palm, World War II (NORMANDY, 27–30 July 1944; DA GO 43, 1950)
French Croix de Guerre with Palm, World War II (MOSELLE RIVER, 12–29, September 1944; DA GO 43, 1950)
French Fourragere (Croix de Guerre colors), World War II (DA GO 43, 1950)

Assignments
First United States Army: 18 December 1943
VIII Corps: 22 January 1944
XX Corps: 9 March 1944
XV Corps: 20 April 1944
VIII Corps: 15 July 1944
XII Corps: 13 August 1944
III Corps: 19 December 1944
VIII Corps: 2 January 1945
XII Corps: 12 January 1945
VIII Corps: 4 April 1945
X Corps: 9 April 1945
VIII Corps: 17 April 1945

See also
 Divisions of the United States Army

References

External links
4th Armored Division official record
 
Cooke Barracks: A Chronology, 1945–2005
 1958 4th armored division yearbook
 Daily chronology of the Fourth Armored Division 

04th Armored Division, U.S.
Armored Division, U.S. 04th
Military units and formations established in 1941
Military units and formations disestablished in 1971
Buchenwald concentration camp